West Guilford/Redstone Lake Water Aerodrome  is located on Redstone Lake, Ontario, Canada and serves the community of West Guilford.

References

Registered aerodromes in Ontario
Seaplane bases in Ontario